I Think I Do is a 1997 American gay-themed romantic comedy film written and directed by Brian Sloan and starring Alexis Arquette. It premiered on June 20, 1997 at the San Francisco International Lesbian and Gay Film Festival, and was also shown at the Toronto International Film Festival later that year, before receiving a small theatrical run on April 10, 1998.

Premise
The film follows the relationship between Bob and Brendan, roommates at George Washington University in Washington, D.C., five years after Bob made his romantic feelings toward Brendan known. When the two reconnect at the wedding of college friends, Bob is in a serious relationship with a soap opera star Sterling Scott, while Brendan is single and re-examining his own identity.

Cast
 Alexis Arquette as Bob
 Christian Maelen as Brendan
 Lauren Vélez as Carol
 Tuc Watkins as Sterling Scott
 Jamie Harrold as Matt
 Guillermo Díaz as Eric
 Maddie Corman as Beth
 Marianne Hagan as Sarah
 Elizabeth Rodriguez as Celia
 Patricia Mauceri as Ms. Rivera
 Marni Nixon as Aunt Alice
 Arden Myrin as Wendy
 Lane Janger (cameo) as Bartender

Production
In an interview with IndieWire, director Brian Sloane stated "I wrote a ten page treatment first and from there I started writing the script. It took me about three weeks to get the first draft. I get very nervous sitting at the computer and not doing anything, so I work very fast when I actually sit down to work. Then in the course of three years, I went through ten drafts. The hardest thing about going through ten drafts during that time was to get all the characters to connect. To find a balance between all the couples and to make the different story lines work together." Filming would take place in New Jersey and Washington, D.C.

Reception
I Think I Do grossed $345,478 while in theaters during 1998, only having been released in 10 theaters. On Rotten Tomatoes, of the 4 reviews listed, 3 are negative, and 1 is positive. In her review, Anita Gates of The New York Times claimed that the film requires "a taste for pointed, topical humor and a particular brand of clever conversation" and that "The characters are uniformly funny and sympathetic, and you want all of them to find the right person and be happy."

References

External links
 
 
 
 

1997 films
1997 romantic comedy films
American independent films
American LGBT-related films
American romantic comedy films
Films set in Washington, D.C.
Films shot in New Jersey
Films shot in Washington, D.C.
George Washington University
1997 independent films
1990s English-language films
1990s American films